Chelladurai (1941 - 7 February 2015) was an Indian comedian who worked in Tamil-language films. He acted in over 350 films.

Career 
Chelladurai made his film debut with Thooral Ninnu Pochchu (1982). He is known for his comic sequences with actor Vadivelu.

He became famous for his role in Shree (2002) as the owner of a wine shop named Prabha. In the scene, Marimuthu (Vadivelu) calls the owner and asks when the shop will open. The owner tells him that the store closed. Vadivelu drinks alcohol and repeatedly disturbs the shop owner during the night.

Death 
Chelladurai was admitted to Keezhpakkam Government Hospital in Chennai due to kidney issues on 8 February after having problems for several months. He died on 7 February 2015 due to high blood pressure.

Filmography 
 Films

Thooral Ninnu Pochchu (1982)
Chinna Pasanga Naanga (1992)
Amma Vanthachu (1992)
Onna Irukka Kathukanum (1992)
Rajakumaran (1994)
Thozhar Pandian (1994)
Sathyavan (1994)
Thirumoorthy (1995)
Gandhi Pirantha Mann (1995)
Seethanam (1995)
Pudhu Nilavu (1996)
Katta Panchayathu (1996)
Avathara Purushan (1996)
Sakthi (1997)
Vaimaye Vellum (1997)
Thaali Pudhusu (1997)
Pongalo Pongal (1997)
Thadayam (1997)
Moovendhar (1998)
Annan (1999)
Nesam Pudhusu (1999)
Sundari Neeyum Sundaran Naanum (1999)
Kannan Varuvaan (2000)
Simmasanam (2000)
Ullam Kollai Poguthae (2001)
Star (2001)
Shree (2002)
Naina (2002)
Chokka Thangam (2003)
Saamy (2003)
Bheeshmar (2003)
Winner (2003)
Vadakku Vaasal (2003)
Kadhal Kirukkan (2003)
Ennavo Pudichirukku (2004)
Settai (2004)
Jore (2004)
Padhavi Paduthum Paadu (2005)
Varapogum Sooriyane (2005)
Mudhal Aasai (2005)
Anbe Vaa (2005)
Aavani Thingal (2006)
Manikanda (2007)
Piragu (2007)
Kee Mu (2008)
Sirithal Rasipen (2009)
Mambattiyan (2011)
 Killadi (2015)

Television
Kana Kaanum Kaalangal (2006-2009)

References

2015 deaths
Year of birth missing 
Indian male film actors
Indian male comedians
Tamil comedians
Male actors in Tamil cinema